Castlehead High School is a non-denominational, mixed state secondary school in Paisley, Renfrewshire, Scotland.
It was opened in 1971.
In 1989, John Neilson High School (founded as the John Neilson Institution in 1852) merged into Castlehead High School.

Associated Primary Schools

Primary Schools
The primary schools that feed into Castlehead are Glencoats Primary School, Wallace Primary School and West Primary School.

Sports
Castlehead is one of six Scottish Football Association Schools of Football.  Under this program, twenty first-year students receive daily coaching, development and recovery sessions and other academic and social development activities. The Schools of Football program is funded through the Scottish Football Association's partnership with Cashback For Communities, a Scottish Government scheme that gives communities illicit monies seized from criminals.

On 8 September 2008, Castlehead hosted the draw for the first round of the 2008–09 Scottish Cup.

Awards
One area of the school's performance identified as needing improvement on the 2005 evaluation was attendance.  In recognition of the effort the school faculty, students and parents made, in 2006 the school won the Scottish Education Award: "Better Behaviour and Attendance Award".

Philip Lawrence Award, in recognition of the school's paired reading program where senior pupils help junior pupils develop their reading skills.

Notable alumni

Elena Baltacha, tennis player
Seán Batty, STV weatherman
Majid Haq, cricket player
Scott Ferguson, Entrepreneur
Richard Madden, actor 
Iain Martin, journalist

References

External links
 

Secondary schools in Renfrewshire
1972 establishments in Scotland
Educational institutions established in 1972
Schools in Paisley, Renfrewshire